Fairview Airport  is located  northwest of the town of Fairview, Alberta, Canada.

References

External links
 Page about this aerodrome on COPA's Places to Fly Airport Directory

Registered aerodromes in Alberta
Municipal District of Fairview No. 136